Kosovo has competed in the IAAF World Athletics Championships four times with their first appearance being in 2015 at Beijing, China with Musa Hajdari competing in the men's 800m. As of 2019, the country has not recorded any medals. Kosovo best performance was in 2015 when Musa Hajdari finished 21st overall in the rankings of the men's 800 metres.

Medal count

Entrants

See also
Kosovo at the European Athletics Championships

References 

Kosovo
World Athletics Championship